Anametalia grandis is a species of sea urchin of the family Brissidae. Their armour is covered with spines. It is placed in the genus Anametalia and lives in the sea. Anametalia grandis was first scientifically described in 1950 by Ole Mortensen.

References 

Brissidae
Animals described in 1950
Taxa named by Ole Theodor Jensen Mortensen